"Paris Latino" is a 1983 song recorded by Bandolero, achieving success in Europe. In 2002, the song was successfully covered by Star Academy 2. In 2017, the movie Call Me By Your Name used the song in its soundtrack. The song was remixed by Jellybean Benitez for radio and club play.

Original version

Track listings
 7" single
 "Paris Latino" — 3:55
 "El bandido caballero" — 3:50

 12" maxi
 "Paris Latino" (U.S. version) — 6:32
 "Paris Latino" (instrumental) — 5:23
 "Paris Latino" (original version) — 5:07
 "Paris Latino" (English version - mix radio) — 6:10

 12" maxi
 "Paris Latino" (extended version) — 5:10
 ""Tango Tango" — 5:20
 "El bandido caballero" — 4:15

Charts

Star Academy 2 version

In late 2002, the song was covered by Star Academy 2, on the album Fait sa boum which is composed of cover versions of 1980s hit. The song, performed during Star Academy's concert tour, is also available on the album Live. It achieved success, topping the singles charts in France and Belgium (Wallonia). As of August 2014, the song was the eleventh best-selling single of the 21st century in France, with 651,000 units sold.

Track listings
 CD single
 "Paris-Latino" — 3:31
 "Video Killed the Radio Star" — 3:23

Certifications

Charts

References

1983 singles
2002 singles
Ultratop 50 Singles (Wallonia) number-one singles
SNEP Top Singles number-one singles
Star Academy France songs
1983 songs